San Bruno Mountain State Park, officially San Bruno Mountain State and County Park, is a park located in northern San Mateo County, California. It is adjacent to the southern boundary of San Francisco and borders the cities of Brisbane, South San Francisco, Colma and Daly City.

San Bruno Mountain State Park is a landmark of local and regional significance, standing as a unique open-space island in the midst of the peninsula's urbanization at the northern end of the Santa Cruz Mountain Range. The park is dominated by San Bruno Mountain which is a  ridge. The park provides habitat for several species of rare and endangered plants and butterflies, including the Mission blue butterfly. Trails to the summit afford views of San Francisco and the Bay Area.

See also 

 List of California state parks
 Parks in San Mateo County, California

External links 
 
 San Bruno Mountain Watch Private advocacy group for the park
 
 Topographic Map
 
 Trailspotting: Hiking trails on San Bruno Mountain Description, Photos and GPS/mapping data

State parks of California
Parks in San Mateo County, California
Santa Cruz Mountains